Rafael Cabral Barbosa (born 20 May 1990), known as Rafael Cabral or simply Rafael, is a Brazilian professional footballer who plays as a goalkeeper for Cruzeiro.

Club career

Santos
Born in Sorocaba, Rafael joined Santos youth system in 2003. In 2010, he was promoted to the first team, but broke his right leg in a split with the centre back Domingos and sidelined for four months.

Rafael played in the second half of the match between Santos and the New York Red Bulls in the United States. It was won by Red Bull by 3–1 but Rafael did not concede a goal, the three goals from New York were scored in the first half, when the goalkeeper was Fábio Costa.

His debut in the first team for Santos in an official game took place on 2 June 2010, the match between Santos and Cruzeiro in Mineirão, where the score was 0–0. He took the place of Felipe, who had played all previous 37 matches that season.

On 20 August 2012, Rafael Cabral's right eye started bleeding when he collided with Juan Manuel Martínez in a 2012 Campeonato Brasileiro Série A fixture between Santos and Corinthians. He then recovered and was able to continue the game. Santos won the game 3–2.

Napoli
On 28 June 2013, Rafael was sold from Santos to Italian side Napoli. The Azzurri paid €5 million for the Brazilian goalkeeper. Rafael made his UEFA Champions League debut against Arsenal in a group stage match in Naples. Napoli won the match 2–0 and Rafael was able to keep a clean sheet against the English side. Nevertheless, Napoli was unable to advance out of the group stages.

He was manager Rafael Benítez's first-choice goalkeeper for the 2014–15 season following the departure of the loaned-in Pepe Reina. On 22 December, in the 2014 Supercoppa Italiana in Doha, he gave Napoli victory over Juventus by saving from Simone Padoin in sudden death at the end of a penalty shootout.

Sampdoria
On 22 July 2018, Rafael Cabral signed with U.C. Sampdoria on a free transfer. On 5 August 2019, Sampdoria announced that Rafael Cabral’s contract with the club had been terminated by mutual agreement.

Reading
On 6 August 2019, Reading announced the signing of Rafael on a three-year contract. Rafael made his debut against Wycombe Wanderers in the EFL Cup and saved two penalties in the penalty shootout win. Rafael made his Sky Bet Championship debut against Cardiff City and gained his first clean sheet for the club in a 3–0 victory. He then went on to claim the No. 1 spot, beating out Everton loanee João Virginia and Sam Walker. Rafael’s heroics during consecutive games in the month of December earned him a spot on WhoScored.com Team of the Month for December 2019.

On 22 July 2020, ahead of the final game of the 2019–20 season, Rafael was announced as the clubs player of the season.

On 17 January 2022, Rafael left Reading after his contract was terminated by mutual consent.

Cruzeiro
On 19 January 2022, Rafael returned to Brazil after 9 years in Europe, signing for Série B club Cruzeiro on a two-year contract.

International career
Rafael made his debut for Brazil against the United States on 30 May 2012, in a 4–1 win.

He was called up to the Brazil national under-23 football team at the London 2012 Summer Olympics but was later replaced due to injury.

Career statistics

Club

Honours
Santos
São Paulo State League: 2010, 2011, 2012
Copa do Brasil: 2010
Copa Libertadores: 2011
Recopa Sudamericana: 2012

Napoli
Coppa Italia: 2013–14
Supercoppa Italiana: 2014

Cruzeiro
 Campeonato Brasileiro - Série B: 2022

Individual
 Reading Player of the Season: 2019–20

References

External links
 sambafoot
 Rafael Cabral in Brazil: the talent factory 2011

1990 births
Living people
People from Sorocaba
Brazilian footballers
Brazilian expatriate footballers
Association football goalkeepers
Santos FC players
Cruzeiro Esporte Clube players
S.S.C. Napoli players
U.C. Sampdoria players
Reading F.C. players
Campeonato Brasileiro Série A players
Campeonato Brasileiro Série B players
Serie A players
English Football League players
Brazil international footballers
Expatriate footballers in Italy
Brazilian expatriate sportspeople in Italy
Footballers from São Paulo (state)